Harvey Elms (born 2 June 1995) is a Scotland 7's international rugby union player.

Rugby Union career

Amateur career

He played for North Berwick and then Currie.

Professional career

In a covid-19 hit season 2020-21 he was with the Glasgow Warriors squad. He did not manage a first team competitive game for the Warriors - but played for their 'A' side at Centre against Edinburgh 'A' on 4 February 2021. At the end of the season, Elms was thanked in a 'leavers video' by the club for his support to the squad over the season.

International career

He received a cap for Scotland U20 before receiving an injury which kept him out of the remainder of the U20 campaign.

He played for Scotland Club XV in 2015 and 2016.

He received his debut cap for Scotland 7's in 2017 in the Dubai leg of the World Rugby Sevens. He played in the 2018 Sevens World Cup. He competed at the 2022 Rugby World Cup Sevens in Cape Town.

Outside of rugby union

Elms is a talented artist. He made the East Lothian Courier newspaper headlines for taking art commissions during the covid-19 pandemic.

References

1995 births
Living people
Currie RFC players
Glasgow Warriors players
North Berwick RFC players
Rugby union players from North Berwick
Scotland Club XV international rugby union players
Scotland international rugby sevens players
Scottish rugby union players
Rugby sevens players at the 2022 Commonwealth Games